= Junfeng Zhang =

American chemist of Chinese descent

Junfeng "Jim" Zhang is an American chemist of Chinese descent who is currently at Duke University and an Elected Fellow of the American Association for the Advancement of Science.
